Tokyo Weekender magazine is the oldest English publication in Japan.

Founded in 1970 by Corky Alexander and Susan Scully, Tokyo Weekender was first published bi-monthly. Now Tokyo Weekender is published monthly and is distributed in embassies, luxury hotels, shops, stations and airports.

Early years

Tokyo Weekender was co-founded by Korean War veteran Millard "Corky" Alexander and Susan Scully, previously co-workers at Pacific Stars and Stripes. It was the first free regular English publication in Japan. As well as being free at various locations, it used to come inside the Friday edition of the English Daily Yomiuri, a real distribution coup. After Corky died, the publication was taken over by his daughter and son-in-law before being relaunched by Caroline Pover. In 2008 Tokyo Weekender was purchased by Bulbouscell Media Group. In 2015, Bulbouscell Media Group was bought by the PR Agency Sunny Side Up Inc., and later merged with ENGAWA K.K., an SSU group company which was established in late 2015. In April 2016, Tokyo Weekender welcomed their new editor in chief Annemarie Luck.

Content

As well as regular contributors Weekender is a lifestyle magazine featuring upcoming events, opinion, Japanese news, interviews, society, travel, product reviews, restaurant and bar reviews, community news and announcements and a section featuring reprints of vintage articles.

After Tokyo Weekender welcomed Annemarie Luck as the editor in chief, the magazine was divided into three parts: "radar", "in-depth" and "guide."

Columnists

 The editorial team includes Annemarie Luck, Lisa Wallin and Nicholas Narigon. 
 The Creative Director of the magazine is Liam Ramshaw.
 Tokyo Weekender's features writer is Matthew Hernon.
 The longest-running contributor to the magazine was Bill Hersey until his passing in 2018. His weekly column on parties was published for over 40 years and lives on with David Schneider's TW Social column.
 Other contributors have included Ian de Stains OBE, formerly of the British Chamber of Commerce in Japan and Japanese broadcaster NHK.

Distribution

Tokyo Weekender is distributed to various embassies, hotels, restaurants, shops and stations around central Tokyo and is also delivered to subscribers via Tokyo Weekender Online or Fujisan, Japan's largest magazine subscription site.

Trivia

 Tokyo Weekender was featured on Japanese news channel NHK and NHK World when the publication celebrated its 40th anniversary in 2010.

References

External links
Online version
 http://www.tokyoweekender.com/

Holding Company
 http://engawa.global/

Archives of original issues
 http://www.tokyoweekender.com/weekender-archives-2017/

1970 establishments in Japan
Bi-monthly magazines
City guides
English-language magazines
Free magazines
Local interest magazines
Magazines established in 1970
Magazines published in Tokyo
News magazines published in Asia